= Virumaa Nädalaleht =

Estonian newspaper

- Publisher: Imre Termonen
- Founded: 1994
- Language: Estonian
- Headquarters: Rakvere

Virumaa Nädalaleht is a newspaper published in Estonia established in 1994.
